Mark Osipovich Reizen, also Reisen or Reyzen (– November 25, 1992), PAU, was a leading Soviet opera basso singer.

Life and career
Reizen was born into a Jewish family of mine workers in 1895 at Zaitsevo village in Ekaterinoslav province (now Horlivka, Donetsk Oblast, Ukraine). He had four brothers and a sister, and all were trained in music, playing mandolin, guitar, balalaika and accordion. He served as a soldier in the First World War. He studied engineering at the Kharkiv Politechnic, and also voice at the Kharkiv Conservatory with the Italian professor Federico Bugamelli in 1919–1920. He  debuted at the Kharkiv Opera in 1921 as Pimen in Mussorgsky's Boris Godunov, and in 1925 moved to the Mariinsky Theatre in Leningrad. Reizen toured Europe performing in Paris, Berlin, Monte Carlo and London in 1929–1930.

A tall man commanding a strong stage presence, he joined the Bolshoi Theatre in 1930, remaining there as a principal bass until his retirement in 1954. Among his roles were: Ivan Susanin and Ruslan in the two Glinka operas, Don Basilio in Il barbiere di Siviglia by Rossini, Mephistopheles in Faust by Gounod, Prince Gremin in Evgeny Onegin by Tchaikovsky, Salieri in Mozart and Salieri and the Viking guest in Sadko by Rimsky-Korsakov, the old gypsy in Aleko by Rachmaninoff,  Wotan in Wagner's Ring of the Nibelungs,  Konchak in Prince Igor by Borodin, Philip II and Procida in Verdi's two French grand operas, and so on. He became a particularly memorable interpreter of Boris and Dosifey in the two greatest operas of Mussorgsky (Boris Godunov and Khovanshchina).

Reizen was awarded the Stalin Prize in 1941, 1949 and 1951.

In 1967 he began teaching, and became a professor at Moscow's Gnessin Institute. He gave an important recital for his 80th birthday, and for his 90th sang Prince Gremin (in Evgeny Onegin) at the Bolshoi in Moscow in July 1985. On both occasions, his voice sounded remarkably preserved.

Reizen died of a stroke in 1992 in Moscow at the age of 97. A number of his recordings are still available on CD, and film clips of his performances also exist.

Quotations

"Reizen is stupendous. His lush, voluminous basso rolls through the music unconstrainedly. It sits easily at the bottom, peels forth brilliant Fs and F-sharps at the top (and one hair-raising high G), and in-between displays flowing line and a mezza-voce that rivals prime Pinza or Chaliapin. Ruslan's heroic fire and tenderness are there – it's a complete piece of work". (Conrad L. Osborne discussing the 1938 recording of Ruslan and Lyudmila, in which Reizen performs the role of Ruslan, in the Metropolitan Opera Guide to Recorded Opera)
“In 1930, Reizen went on a tour of the Moscow Bolshoi Theatre, sang Mephistopheles (Faust) and was immediately noticed by Stalin, who was a music and opera lover. He described a somewhat comical scene as he was invited to the official government box during the intermission, where, dressed as the Devil, he was introduced to Stalin. The dialogue went something like this:
–You sing very well.
–Thank you.
–Why don't you come here more often?
–You see, I sing in Leningrad and only visit here.
–Why not move here and visit there?
–You see, I have a contract there, and an apartment too…
–Perhaps we can do something and find you an apartment here.
The following day and in typical Soviet style, he was surprised by the unannounced visit of an official car with an NKVD agent, who was under orders to take him hunting for an apartment. 
This is how Mark Reizen was engaged at the Bolshoi.” (Anecdote, Opera Gems)
(Mark Reizen – Autobiography [Autobiograficheskie Zapisky, Stati i Vospominanya) 2nd edition 1986 pp. 135)

Recordings and discography
Lebendige Vergangenheit - Mark Reizen CD 0717281890595 Label: Preiser 1997, Time: 76 minutes (with biographical liner notes).
"Mark Reizen - Mussorgsky, Rachmaninov, Tchaikovsky, Taneyev, Kabelevsky" AQVR 308-2 (Aquarius Classics)
"Mark Reizen - Romances by Tchaikovsky AQVR 309-2 (Aquarius Classics)
"Mark Reizen - Dargomyzhsky's Rusalka" AQVR 390-2 (Aquarius Classics)*"Mark Reizen - Romances and songs " AQVR305-2 (Aquarius classics)
"Mark Reizen in Rimsky-Korsakov's The Maid of Pskov AQVR 352-2 (Aquarius classics)
Detailed discography: , .

References

Bibliography
Piotr Kaminski: article in Guide de L'Opera, Fayard, France, 1992, p. 690
Steane, J B: "Reyzen, Mark"  in the New Grove Dictionary of Opera, ed. Stanley Sadie (London, 1992)

External links
Mark Reizen on Russia in US site
Opera Gems
Musical Tales: Great Basses
Basse noble
On YouTube (audio only) singing the "Song of the Viking Guest" from Rimsky-Korsakov's opera Sadko.

1895 births
1992 deaths
Soviet male opera singers
Operatic basses
Stalin Prize winners
Ukrainian Jews
Russian basses
20th-century Russian male opera singers